Built in 2003, Fair Field is a large private house in the Hamptons, Long Island, in New York State in the United States. It is valued between $267 to $500 million for tax purposes. It is owned by junk bond financier Ira Rennert.

References

Long Island
Houses in Suffolk County, New York